Pseudaminobacter defluvii is a Gram-negative, oxidase-positive, rod-shaped, motile bacteria from the genus of Pseudaminobacter.

References

External links
Type strain of Pseudaminobacter defluvii at BacDive -  the Bacterial Diversity Metadatabase

Phyllobacteriaceae
Bacteria described in 1999